Casuarina oligodon, the she oak, is a species of Casuarina tree first described by Lawrence Alexander Sidney Johnson. Casuarina oligodon is part of the genus Casuarina and the family Casuarinaceae. It is dioecious, very rarely monoecious.

Range
She oak is native to Papua New Guinea.

References 

oligodon
Flora of Papua New Guinea
Dioecious plants